Sherif El-Digwy (born 16 April 1965) is an Egyptian judoka. He competed in the men's heavyweight event at the 1984 Summer Olympics.

References

External links
 

1965 births
Living people
Egyptian male judoka
Olympic judoka of Egypt
Judoka at the 1984 Summer Olympics
Place of birth missing (living people)
20th-century Egyptian people
21st-century Egyptian people